'Akane', also known as 'Tokyo Rose', 'Tohoku No.3' and 'Prime Red', is a Japanese cultivar of domesticated apple, that according to Orange Pippin is one of the best early season apples.

'Akane' was developed by the Morika Experimental Station of Japan sometime between 1900 and 1949, by crossing a Jonathan apple with a Worcester Pearmain, and was introduced to the United States in 1937, where it is very popular.

Description
'Akane' is of moderately good disease resistance, best at warm climates but tolerates cold also. It flowers mid-late season, and should be harvested early-mid season. It is self-sterile and needs to be cross pollinated.

It produces heavy crop of variable sized fruits, usually more to the smaller side, but good sized apples can be obtained by thinning. 

'Akane' carries the fruit shape of the English 'Worcester Pearmain', and the unusually good balanced flavor of the 'Jonathan'. Shape ranges from flattened to heart-shaped. Fruits have a very good flavor, a blend of sweet and sharp, preferable for eating, keeps shape in cooking. Flesh color is white, with a yellow tinge. The flesh does not oxidize quickly. The apple is crisp, but not too dense; it is easy to eat. Skin color is red. The fruit keeps fresh for about one week.

References

Apple cultivars
Japanese apples